Events from the year 1424 in Ireland.

Incumbent
Lord: Henry VI

Events

Births

Deaths
 Ulick an Fhiona Burke, 3rd Clanricarde

 
1420s in Ireland
Ireland
Years of the 15th century in Ireland